Ripe is the sixth album by Australian musician Ben Lee, released on 18 September 2007. Produced by John Alagia, the album features guest appearances from Mandy Moore, Benji Madden, Benmont Tench, Rachael Yamagata, Rooney, Sara Watkins and Charlotte Martin.

It entered the ARIA Albums Chart at No. 11 on 24 September.

Track listing
"Love Me Like the World Is Ending" (featuring Rachael Yamagata) – 3:46
"American Television" (featuring Rooney) – 3:40
"Birds and Bees" (featuring Mandy Moore) – 3:09
"Is This How Love's Supposed to Feel?" (featuring Charlotte Martin) – 4:17
"Blush" – 3:55
"Numb" – 2:57
"What Would Jay-Z Do?" – 2:54
"Sex Without Love" (featuring Benji Madden) – 3:31
"Home" – 2:39
"So Hungry" – 3:34
"Just Say Yes" – 5:24
"Ripe" – 3:05

Personnel
 John Alagia – guitar, acoustic guitar, electric guitar, tack piano, organ, shaker, tambourine, background vocals
 Matt Chamberlain – drums, tambourine, percussion
 Mark Goldenberg – electric guitar, slide guitar
 Nick Johns – piano, Fender Rhodes piano, harmonium, Wurlitzer organ, Mellotron, ARP synthesizer, Moog synthesizer, vibraphone
 Charlotte Martin – piano, background vocals
 Mandy Moore – vocals, background vocals
 Todd M. Simon – trumpet
 Sara Watkins – background vocals
 Ben Lee – vocals, acoustic guitar, electric guitar

Charts

Certifications

References

Ben Lee albums
2007 albums
Albums produced by John Alagía
New West Records albums